Barskoye is a rural locality (a village) in Yurovskoye Rural Settlement, Gryazovetsky District, Vologda Oblast, Russia. The population was 15 as of 2002.

Geography 
Barskoye is located 20 km southwest of Gryazovets (the district's administrative centre) by road. Prokopyevo is the nearest rural locality.

References 

Rural localities in Gryazovetsky District